Nakia Shine Coleman (born October 17, 1975), better known by his stage name Kia Shine, is an American rapper, songwriter and record producer from Memphis, Tennessee. He is perhaps best known for his commercial debut single "Krispy", which is also the lead single from his 2007 debut album Due Season. He has worked with several fellow rappers, such as Mike Jones, Yo Gotti, Nelly, Jim Jones, among others. Kia Shine is co-CEO, alongside rapper Jack Frost, of Rap Hustlaz. Kia Shine won the Southern Entertainment Award (S.E.A.) in 2008 for best underground artist having sold over 200,000 albums with his independent label, Rap Hustlaz.
His 2007 single "W.O.W." was the inspiration for the "wow" feature on the social media website HellaDoge, where members can earn Dogecoin for making posts and giving "wows" (similar to the "like" feature on other social media).

Music career

2006–2007: Due Season
In August 2006, he hosted an episode of BET's Rap City. Shine's debut single is "Krispy". The song peaked at number 66 on the US Billboard Hot R&B/Hip-Hop Songs chart and number 24 on the Hot Rap Tracks chart. Shine's major label debut, Due Season, was released on Universal Records on July 31, 2007.  A remix was released in late July 2007 featuring E-40, Jim Jones, Swizz Beatz, LL Cool J, Remy Ma, Young Buck, Fabolous and Slim Thug.

2009
On March 3 Kia Shine released "Checkin' My Fresh", the lead single off his upcoming Mixtape 2000 Shine via DatPiff. The single features Maino & Young Dro and samples part of Jay-Z's verse from "Swagga Like Us". The music video was directed by Kurt Williams and was the New Joint of the Day on 106 & Park July 3.

2010
Kia Shine released the first of his Alarm Clock Theory mixtape series which was made popular by his phrase "Everybody sleeping on me will wake up working for me". This project was very well received and received over 100,000 downloads.

In September 2010 Kia Shine won another BMI award for his contribution to the lyrics of Drake "Best I Ever Had".

In October 2010 Kia Shine released "Club Walmart" via iTunes. This single featured Yung Joc.

2011–present
Kia Shine released "Newmonia" via iTunes.  The single features Atlanta rapper Yung Sean.  The single was also written and produced by Kia Shine & Yung Sean. The video was directed Dre Cannonz, A friend of Kia Shine, Newmonia was featured on 106 and Park on 7 August 2011.

Controversy

Drake
Kia Shine stated that he owned 25% of Drake's "Best I Ever Had", which Drake later denied. Kia Shine later received 4 BMI awards and a Grammy nomination for his credit on "Best I Ever Had".

Discography

Studio albums
2007: Due Season

EPs
2008: The Kush - EP
2009: Checkin' My Fresh - EP
2010: Club Walmart  (Single)
2010: Dreads - EP2011: Newmonia  (Single)

Mixtapes
2009: 2000Shine
2010: The Alarm Clock Theory
2011: Memphis Beat

Singles

References

1980 births
Living people
African-American male rappers
African-American record producers
African-American songwriters
American hip hop record producers
American music industry executives
Businesspeople from Tennessee
Rappers from Memphis, Tennessee
Songwriters from Tennessee
Southern hip hop musicians
21st-century American rappers
21st-century American male musicians
Universal Motown Records artists
21st-century African-American musicians
20th-century African-American people
American male songwriters